The 2021 National Premier Leagues was the ninth season of the Australian National Premier Leagues football competition. The league competition was played by eight separate state and territory member federations. The divisions are ACT, NSW, Northern NSW, Queensland, South Australia, Tasmania, Victoria and Western Australia.

The season was disrupted for most federations due to the impacts from the COVID-19 pandemic in Australia.

League tables

ACT
The season was cancelled in September, from government-imposed lockdowns, due to the impacts from the COVID-19 pandemic in Australia. Tigers FC were the NPL1 Premiers (based on a points per match formula rather than aggregate points).

NSW
The season was cancelled on 12 August, due to on-going lockdowns associated with the COVID-19 pandemic in Australia, with no Premier declared, and with promotion and relegation suspended until the following season.

Northern NSW
The season was cancelled in September, from government-imposed lockdowns, due to the impacts from the COVID-19 pandemic in Australia. Lambton Jaffas were the NPL Premiers (based on a points per match formula rather than aggregate points).

Queensland
The season was suspended between late July and late August due to the impacts from the COVID-19 pandemic in Australia.

Finals

South Australia

Finals

Tasmania

Victoria
The season was cancelled on 3 September, due to on-going lockdowns associated with the COVID-19 pandemic in Australia, with no Premier declared, and with promotion and relegation suspended until the following season. However, as a result of a court challenge involving Avondale FC and Football Victoria, it was agreed that eight rounds of games from the 2022 NPL Season would also count towards the 2021 NPL league table, enabling sufficient matches to be played to "complete" the season, and be able to declare a Premier for 2021. Oakleigh Cannons were crowned as Premiers on 26 July 2022.

Western Australia

Finals

References

External links
 Official website

2021
2021 domestic association football leagues
2021 in Australian soccer